Gadi Hazut (born 20 July 1969) is an Israeli former professional footballer that has played in Hapoel Be'er Sheva.

Honours

Club
 Hapoel Be'er Sheva

 Premier League:
 Third place (3): 1993/1994, 1994/1995, 1996/1997
 State Cup:
 Winners (1): 1996/1997
 Toto Cup:
 Winners (2): 1988/1989, 1995/1996
 Lillian Cup:
 Winners (1): 1988

References

1969 births
Living people
Israeli footballers
Hapoel Be'er Sheva F.C. players
Maccabi Ironi Ashdod F.C. players
F.C. Ashdod players
Liga Leumit players
Israeli Premier League players
Israel international footballers
Footballers from Beersheba
Israeli people of Moroccan-Jewish descent
Association football defenders